Carlton is an census-designated place in Clarke County, Alabama, United States. As of the 2010 census, its population was 65. It was formerly known as Hal's Lake. The Isaac Nettles Gravestones are located in Carlton in the Mount Nebo Baptist Church Cemetery. They are listed on the National Register of Historic Places. There was one convenience store in Carlton until 2009.

Geography

Demographics

References

Unincorporated communities in Alabama
Census-designated places in Clarke County, Alabama
Census-designated places in Alabama